The 2013 Nanjing Ladies Open was a professional tennis tournament played on outdoor hard courts. It was the inaugural edition of the tournament and was part of the 2013 WTA 125K series. It took place in Nanjing, China, on 28 October–3 November 2013.

Singles draw entrants

Seeds 

 1 Rankings as of 21 October 2013

Other entrants 
The following players received wildcards into the singles main draw:
  Wang Qiang
  Zhang Yuxuan
  Wang Yafan
  Sun Ziyue

The following players received entry from the qualifying draw:
  Tereza Mrdeža
  Jarmila Gajdošová
  Xu Yifan
  Nicha Lertpitaksinchai

The following player received entry into the singles main draw as a lucky loser:
  Peangtarn Plipuech

Doubles draw entrants

Seeds

Champions

Singles 

  Zhang Shuai def.  Ayumi Morita 6–4, retired

Doubles

  Misaki Doi /  Xu Yifan def.  Yaroslava Shvedova /  Zhang Shuai 6–1, 6–4

References 

2013 WTA 125K series
2013
2013 in Chinese tennis